Trevisani is an Italian surname. It may refer to:

 Angelo Trevisani (1669–after 1753), Italian painter
 Carter Trevisani (born 1982), Canadian ice hockey player
 Francesco Trevisani (1656–1746), Italian painter
 Niccolò Trevisani, Venetian soldier ( see Battle of Pavia (1431) )

See also
 Trevisan (Trévisan), a surname page
 Treviso, Italy, where the local dialect is known as Trevisan
 Trevisani, Latin, No Honor, Untrustworthy